was a Japanese artist.

Biography 

Chieko Takamura was born in the town of Adachi in what is now the city of Nihonmatsu, Fukushima Prefecture as Chieko Naganuma, the eldest of six daughters and two sons.

In 1903, she went to the Japan Women's University in Tokyo, and graduated in 1907. She became an oil painter, and made colorful papercuts. She was an early member of the Japanese feminist movement Seitōsha, joining in 1911. She made the cover illustration for the first issue of their magazine,  "Seitō". It began as a literary outlet for woman writers and quickly turned into a forum for discussing feminist issues. These women were from the upper-middle class and soon were labeled "New Women" because of their views and their lifestyles.  In February 1914, she married Kōtarō Takamura, a sculptor and poet, whom she met soon after he had returned from France.

Following the breakup of her family home in 1929, she was diagnosed in 1931 with symptoms of schizophrenia – she was hospitalized for that disease in 1935, and remained there until her death from tuberculosis in 1938.

Kōtarō's book of poems about her, is still widely admired and read today. The translated title, "Chieko's Sky", is from one of the poems, where Chieko longs for the sky of her childhood.

See also 
 Portrait of Chieko

References

External links
 One biography
 A book description from Amazon.com

1886 births
1938 deaths
20th-century Japanese painters
20th-century Japanese women artists
Artists from Fukushima Prefecture
Japanese feminists